The 2020–21 W-League season was the thirteenth season of the W-League, the Australian national women's association football competition. The season started on 29 December 2020 and ended with the Grand final on 11 April 2021.

Clubs

Stadiums and locations

Personnel and kits

Managerial changes

Transfers

Foreign players

The following do not fill a Visa position:
A Australian citizens who have chosen to represent another national team;
B Those players who were born and started their professional career abroad but have since gained Australian citizenship;
G Guest Players;
R Injury Replacement Players, or National Team Replacement Players

Regular season 
The regular season commenced on 29 December 2020, and ran until 31 March 2021.

League table

Results

Fixtures

Round 1

Round 2

Round 3

Round 4

Round 5

Round 6

Round 7

Round 8

Round 9

Round 10

Round 11

Round 12

Round 13

Round 14

Finals series

Semi-finals

Grand final

Regular season statistics

Leading goalscorers

Hat-tricks

Notes
 (H) – Home team

Finals series statistics

Hat-tricks

Notes
 (A) – Away team

End-of-season awards
The following end of the season awards were announced at the 2020–21 Dolan Warren Awards night on 23 June 2021.
 Julie Dolan Medal – Michelle Heyman (Canberra United)
 NAB Young Footballer of the Year – Kyra Cooney-Cross (Melbourne Victory)
 Golden Boot Award – Emily Gielnik (Brisbane Roar) (13 goals)
 Goalkeeper of the Year – Teagan Micah (Melbourne City)
 Coach of the Year – Jeff Hopkins (Melbourne Victory)
 Fair Play Award – Brisbane Roar
 Referee of the Year – Rebecca Durcau
 Goal of the Year – Lisa De Vanna (Melbourne Victory v Melbourne City, 10 January 2021)

See also

 W-League transfers for 2020–21 season
 2020–21 Canberra United W-League season
 2020–21 Newcastle Jets W-League season
 2020–21 Sydney FC W-League season

References

Australia
2020–21
2020–21 in Australian women's soccer
2020–21 W-League (Australia)